Cannon Creek Lake is a  reservoir in Bell County, Kentucky. It was built in 1972.

References

Buildings and structures completed in 1972
Buildings and structures in Bell County, Kentucky
Protected areas of Bell County, Kentucky
Reservoirs in Kentucky
Bodies of water of Bell County, Kentucky